Taher Shah is a Pakistani singer, best known for his songs "Eye to Eye" and "Angel". He has been described as "Pakistan's most spectacular internet celebrity" by Dawn newspaper. It was thought that he left singing after receiving death threats, but he released an animated Urdu song, "omaad nahi hai Farishta", in April 2020.

Career 
Shah became famous in 2013 when he released his first song "Eye to Eye". In an interview, he stated that it took him a year and half to write the lyrics for the song and to complete the whole project. According to Indian Express, the song achieved "enormous success", and according to The Atlantic the song made him an "overnight pop sensation". The song went viral on social media, and many artists dedicated their covers to the singer. In 2016, Shah's new video for the song "Mankind's Angel" was released, causing what the BBC described as a "social media frenzy".

In December 2016, it was announced that Shah had left Pakistan after receiving death threats. He currently resides in the United States with his family.

In April 2020, he released an animated Urdu music video named "Farishta" ("Angel").

References 

Pakistani record producers
Living people
Pakistani male singers
Place of birth missing (living people)
Year of birth missing (living people)
English-language singers from Pakistan
Victims of cyberbullying
People from Karachi